Teerthdham Mangalayatan Mandir or Teerthdham Mangalyatan is a Jain Pilgrimage site on Aligarh-Agra Highway, Hathras, Uttar Pradesh, India. Developed by Shri Adinath Kund-Kund Kahan Digamber Jain Trust, the pilgrimage also includes a Bahubali temple in its infrastructure.

References

External links
 

Hathras district
Jain temples in Uttar Pradesh